Eugenia koolauensis, commonly known as Koolau eugenia or nioi, is a species of flowering plant in the myrtle family, Myrtaceae. It is endemic to Hawaii, where it could previously be found on the islands of Molokai and Oahu; today populations only exist on the latter. This is a federally listed endangered species of the United States.

This is one of two Eugenia species native to Hawaii, and the only endemic. It is a shrub or tree grows 2 to 7 meters tall. The tips of the branches and the undersides of the leaves are hairy. White flowers occur in the leaf axils

Habitat
It inhabits dry gulches and ridges in coastal mesic and mixed mesic forests on the Koolau and Waianae Ranges. Associated plant species include maile (Alyxia oliviformis), ahakea lau nui (Bobea elatior), Carex meyenii, uluhe (Dicranopteris linearis), kōlea lau nui  (Myrsine lessertiana), olopua (Nestegis sandwicensis), hala pepe (Pleomele halapepe), ālaa (Pouteria sandwicensis), alahee (Psydrax odorata), hao (Rauvolfia sandwicensis), and pūkiawe (Styphelia tameiameiae).

It is threatened by habitat loss and recently Puccinia psidii, a non-native fungal disease.

In 2008 there were fewer than 300 mature plants in the Koolau Range and only three in the Waianae Range. It is extirpated from the island of Molokai, where its former habitat was cleared for pineapple fields.

Gallery

References

External links

koolauensis
Plants described in 1932
Endemic flora of Hawaii
Trees of Hawaii
Taxonomy articles created by Polbot